The Transport and Housing Bureau (THB) was an agency of the Government of Hong Kong between 2007 and 2022, responsible for a range of policies such as the internal and external transportation, including air transport, land transport, maritime transport, logistics and housing development in Hong Kong. The bureau was headed by the Secretary for Transport and Housing (STH).

The bureau was formed on 1 July 2007 to take over the transport portfolios previously under the purview of the Environment, Transport and Works Bureau, and the public housing portfolios of the Housing, Planning and Lands Bureau. On 1 July 2022, the THB was split up into the Transport and Logistics Bureau (TLB) and the Housing Bureau.

Subordinate entities
The bureau was divided into two branches, the Transport Branch and the Housing Branch. The following public entities are controlled by the bureau:

Transport
Land and Waterborne Transport
Air Services
Maritime Transport
Logistics Development

Housing
Housing Authority / Housing Department
Appeal Panel (Housing)
Estate Agents Authority
Appeal Panel (Estate Agents Ordinance)
Housing Managers Registration Board

See also 
Airport Authority Hong Kong
MTR Corporation
Hong Kong Maritime and Port Board

References

External links 
 Transport and Housing Bureau (official site) 

Hong Kong government policy bureaux
Hong Kong
1973 establishments in Hong Kong
Government agencies established in 1973